Uganda is scheduled to compete at the 2024 Summer Olympics in Paris from 26 July to 11 August 2024. Since the nation's official debut in 1956, Ugandan athletes have appeared in every edition of the Summer Olympic Games, except for Montreal 1976 as part of the Congolese-led boycott.

Competitors
The following is the list of number of competitors in the Games.

Athletics

Ugandan track and field athletes achieved the entry standards for Paris 2024, either by passing the direct qualifying mark (or time for track and road races) or by world ranking, in the following events (a maximum of 3 athletes each):

Track and road events

References

2024
Nations at the 2024 Summer Olympics
2024 in Ugandan sport